Compleat may refer to:

 an archaic spelling of complete
 COMPLEAT (Bioinformatics tool)

See also
 
 The Compleat Angler, a 1653 fishing book by Izaak Walton
 The Compleat Housewife, a 1727 cookery book by Eliza Smith